The Cerquilla River is a right tributary of the Cega River in Spain. Its approximately 30 km of route runs through the north of the province of Segovia.

Route 
The Cerquilla River begins in the municipality of Fuentepiñel, then later crosses the south of the municipality of Fuentesaúco de Fuentidueña, separates Cozuelos de Fuentidueña from Olombrada, then enters the municipality of Perosillo, where it meets with the Cagarroñas stream. After meeting with Cagarroñas, it crosses the urban area of Frumales and, approaching the last kilometers of its route, enters Cuéllar through , where it meets with the Mondajos stream and begins to mark the border of the Mar de Pinares. In the La Vega area, next to the Pradillos stream, it borders the  area.

References 

Rivers of Spain
Rivers of Castile and León
Segovia
Tributaries of the Douro River